Dayton High School is a public high school in Dayton, Oregon, United States. The building was built in 1937 and remodeled in 2000.

Academics

In 2008, 85% of the school's seniors received their high school diploma. Of 80 students, 68 graduated, 6 dropped out, and 6 are still in high school.

Notable alumni
 Jim Bunn, former U.S. congressman
 Stan Bunn, former Oregon Superintendent of Public Instruction
 Dante Rosario, professional football player

References 

National Register of Historic Places in Yamhill County, Oregon
Buildings and structures in Dayton, Oregon
Educational institutions established in 1937
High schools in Yamhill County, Oregon
School buildings on the National Register of Historic Places in Oregon
Public high schools in Oregon
1937 establishments in Oregon